The Men's 1996 European Amateur Boxing Championships were held in Vejle, Denmark from March 30 to April 7. The 31st edition of the bi-annual competition, in which 304 fighters from 35 countries participated this time, was organised by the European governing body for amateur boxing, EABA.

Medal winners

Medal table

External links
Results

European Amateur Boxing Championships
European Amateur Boxing Championships
B
B
European Amateur Boxing Championships
European Amateur Boxing Championships